Vineyard is a census-designated place (CDP) in Sacramento County, California, United States. It is part of the Sacramento–Arden-Arcade–Roseville Metropolitan Statistical Area. The population was 24,836 at the 2010 census, up from 10,109 at the 2000 census. Along with more than doubling its population in just one decade, Vineyard also grew to become one of Greater Sacramento's most racially diverse suburbs.

Geography
Vineyard is located at  (38.464488, -121.346917).

It is bordered roughly by Jackson Road on the north, roughly a line  mile to the east of Grant Line Road, Calvine Road on the south, and Elk Grove Florin Road on the west.

Demographics

2010
At the 2010 census Vineyard had a population of 24,836. The racial makeup of Vineyard was 11,306 (45.5%) White, 3,426 (11.8%) African American, 163 (0.7%) Native American, 7,293 (24.4%) Asian, 256 (1.0%) Pacific Islander, 1,682 (6.8%) from other races, and 1,710 (6.9%) from two or more races. Hispanic or Latino of any race were 4,414 persons (17.8%).

The census reported that 24,712 people (99.5% of the population) lived in households, 107 (0.4%) lived in non-institutionalized group quarters, and 17 (0.1%) were institutionalized.

There were 7,371 households, 3,832 (52.0%) had children under the age of 18 living in them, 4,681 (63.5%) were opposite-sex married couples living together, 1,071 (14.5%) had a female householder with no husband present, 443 (6.0%) had a male householder with no wife present.  There were 387 (5.3%) unmarried opposite-sex partnerships, and 65 (0.9%) same-sex married couples or partnerships. 886 households (12.0%) were one person and 247 (3.4%) had someone living alone who was 65 or older. The average household size was 3.35.  There were 6,195 families (84.0% of households); the average family size was 3.63.

The age distribution was 7,549 people (30.4%) under the age of 18, 2,352 people (9.5%) aged 18 to 24, 6,765 people (27.2%) aged 25 to 44, 6,386 people (25.7%) aged 45 to 64, and 1,784 people (7.2%) who were 65 or older.  The median age was 33.8 years. For every 100 females, there were 96.9 males.  For every 100 females age 18 and over, there were 93.0 males.

There were 7,744 housing units at an average density of 450.1 per square mile, of the occupied units 5,740 (77.9%) were owner-occupied and 1,631 (22.1%) were rented. The homeowner vacancy rate was 2.2%; the rental vacancy rate was 3.9%.  18,798 people (75.7% of the population) lived in owner-occupied housing units and 5,914 people (23.8%) lived in rental housing units.

2000

Expansion plans
Recently, plans have been announced to add as many as 20,000 new homes to Vineyard, which could add as many as 60,000 new people to the CDP. Along with the houses would come new shopping centers, parks, and schools. Some have been critical of the expansion, and one California State University, Sacramento professor referred to it as "car-oriented sprawl development." However, there are plans to extend some sort of public transportation to Vineyard and to build around the train tracks that go through the town.

Politics
In the state legislature Vineyard is located in the 6th Senate District, represented by Democrat Richard Pan, and in the 8th Assembly District, represented by Democrat Ken Cooley.

Schools
 Sheldon High School

Adjacent areas

References

External links
Vineyard to Sprout Homes

Census-designated places in Sacramento County, California
Census-designated places in California